Mboma is a village in the Lobaye region in the Central African Republic southwest of the capital, Bangui.

Nearby towns and villages include Bonguele (0.8 nm), Ndimbi (2.0 nm), Boubanzegue (1.4 nm), Botoko (2.2 nm) and Mbi (1.0 nm).

See also
Communes of Cameroon

References

Populated places in Lobaye